"Running Scared" is a song performed by Azerbaijani duo Ell & Nikki. It won the Eurovision Song Contest 2011 for Azerbaijan, held in Düsseldorf, Germany. The song was performed in, and qualified from, the first semi-final on 10 May. It was performed in the final on 14 May, and won with 221 points. Ell and Nikki were the first mixed-gender duo to win the contest since 1963 and the first winners from Azerbaijan.

Background
Prior to the release of Running Scared, neither singer had performed in a duo. According to Eldar Gasimov, at the initial stage, both singers were unsure of the success of such a project.

Production and selection
Running Scared was chosen from among 70 submissions coming from both Azerbaijan and abroad which were received by ITV within four weeks from January 10. Eldar Gasimov stated that the song was a perfect common ground for the singers' varying styles, voices and spirits.

The authors of the song are Stefan Örn, Sandra Bjurman from Sweden together with Iain Farquharson from the UK. Örn and Bjurman are also authors of the song "Drip Drop", which represented Azerbaijan at the Eurovision Song Contest 2010.

Acoustic and remix versions of the song were made by German DJ Azzido Da Bass in late April 2011.

Running Scared set a new record for lowest average score on a Eurovision winner, earning 5.26 points per jury and breaking the previous record held by Helena Paparizou's My Number One, the 2005 winner.

Music video
The official videoclip for Running Scared was released on 11 April 2011 and was directed by Tarmo Krimm. It was preceded by a promotional video released earlier in March. Krimm, who was also the producer of the Eurovision Song Contest 2002 held in his native Estonia, won the right to direct this videoclip after submitting his proposal in February 2011.

The video was shot in southern Crimea, the videoclip features Ell taking photographs of Nikki as she appears sitting on a cliff with a Labrador Retriever and taking a ride on a cable car. These scenes are interrupted by shots of Ell and Nikki singing both separately and together. In the end, Ell is shown climbing up the cliff while Nikki looks at him tenderly, and the joined couple sings the final chorus standing face-to-face.

Charts

Weekly charts

References

External links
 Facebook Page: Running Scared
 Eldar & Nigar - Eurovision 2011 Winners (official video)

 Eldar & Nigar Official Facebook Page

Eurovision songs of 2011
Eurovision songs of Azerbaijan
English-language Azerbaijani songs
Azerbaijani songs
Eurovision Song Contest winning songs
Songs written by Iain James
2011 debut singles
Songs written by Stefan Örn
EMI Records singles
2011 songs
Songs written by Sandra Bjurman